Elections for Coventry City Council were held on Thursday 5 May 2011.  As the council is elected by thirds, one seat in each of the wards was up for election. The vote took place alongside the 2011 United Kingdom Alternative Vote referendum.

Labour took five seats (Bablake, Sherbourne, Westwood, Whoberley, and Woodlands) from the Conservatives, and retained control of the council with an increased majority, holding 35 out of 54 seats.

During the election count, a box of ballot papers for Cheylesmore ward was misplaced. Before they were discovered, Councillor Kevin Foster was about to concede that he had lost his seat, although after the additional votes were counted he had retained it.

Election result

Council composition
The composition of the council before and after the election can be found in the following table:

Ward results

Note: the Green Party candidate stood in this ward as an independent at the last election, so it could be argued that he had a swing of -4.2%

Note: The Conservative Party candidate for Henley, Steven Henry Charles Keough, withdrew his nomination.

References

2011 English local elections
2011
2010s in Coventry